Salam Toronto is the first Persian-English bilingual weekly publications in Canada being published since October 2000.

In publication since October 2000, Salam Toronto earned the distinction of being the first and only ethnic publication to be elected as a board member of Ontario Community Newspapers Association (OCNA). With an immediate online edition  available every Thursday, Salam Toronto can be read from all over the world, and at any time.

Serving the rapidly growing Iranian Canadian population of southern Ontario, Salam Torontos readership has grown significantly over the past decade, and extends its reach as far east as Ottawa and as far west as Windsor. Based in Thornhill, Ontario, Salam Toronto is at the heart of the Iranian Canadian population, and in close proximity to the large community found in Toronto, Richmond Hill and Markham.

''Salam Torontos main approach is to promote the Canadian way of life as well as optimism, acceptance, compromise, cooperation, civil responsibility, individualism and respect.

It focuses on issues pertaining to those living in southern Ontario specifically, and encourages its readership to fully participate in Canadian society and not only add to it, but also learn from it. Its popular "What's Up" section keeps readers up to date with events and activities going around the city, and its multitude of exclusive interviews with community leaders, politicians, and dignitaries brings the reader informative, entertaining and relevant news.

Achievements and awardsSalam Toronto has been recognized for its work in promoting multicultural values, as it was granted a medal for distinguished services provided to the arts and other industries, as well as for promoting equality and respect for human rights and values, and fostering understanding among various cultural groups.

In June 2002, in a ceremony attended by Foreign Affair Minister, Mr. Bill Graham, Mohsen received the Canadian Ethnic 
Journalists' and Writers' Club Award for its editorial Thank you Toronto encouraging the city's continued participation in Olympic bidding. Some of Mohsen's editorials are available in the editorial section on Salam Toronto's website.

On May 22, 2008, York Regional Police named Salam Toronto's feature story on Community-Police relations by Sallya Aleboyeh as its "Best Feature story of the Year - in Print". The story emphasized the need for Iranian Canadians to develop open lines of communication with Officers and to report any instances of injustice.

In October 2009, Salam Toronto, in collaboration with Bukhara magazine, invited Bukhara'''s Editor-in-Chief, Mr. Ali Dehbashi to Toronto to deliver a series of lectures at the Universities of Toronto, Carlton and Queen's. Bukhara is a very well known and respected Persian language magazine printed in Tehran, Iran whose aim is to publish scholarly articles about Persian history, art, culture, philosophy and literature.

Demographics

Since the 1990s, Iranians have been among the top 10 immigrant populations in Canada. In 2008 alone, more than 6000 Iranians became permanent residents. Almost all of the newly arrived Iranians tend to choose GTA as the place of their residence.
The current number of Iranian-Canadians in Southern Ontario is estimated to be over 140,000 and this number is rapidly
increasing.
The number of Iranians living in Richmond Hill for instance has more than doubled since 2001 and Persian is now the third most spoken language in Richmond Hill, behind English and Chinese. Persian makes up for 7% of the mother tongue languages spoken in Richmond Hill.

Iranian-Canadians are also among the three highest educated ethnic groups in Canada (the other two being Chinese Canadians and Indo-Canadians). Around 10,000 Iranian students are estimated to be studying at the three big universities in Toronto with approximately 100 professors of Iranian background teaching in Canadian universities.

Editor in Chief
 Mohsen Taghavi

Editor-in-Chief Mohsen Taghavi is a professional journalist with close to 30 years experience, working as an editor with major dailies in Iran before migrating to Canada and working for other ethnic publications there.

Columnists

 Azim Ahmed
 Hamaseh Doroudi
 Zahra Ziaie
 Dr. Bizhan Pardis
 Farahnaz Jahed
 Maxiar Mirhosseini

Distribution

In addition to subscriptions, and online editions, Salam Toronto is distributed to more than 150 common/high traffic locations in the GTA in hard copies and on a weekly basis (every Thursday). These locations include offices, restaurants, super markets, pharmacies etc. The table below depicts some of these locations:

References

External links
 Salam Toronto Weekly
 2008 Better Newspaper Awards presented at the 2009 OCNA convention
 Interactive PDF Edition

2000 establishments in Ontario
Newspapers established in 2000
Iranian-Canadian culture
Persian-language newspapers
Multicultural and ethnic newspapers published in Canada
Bilingual newspapers
Weekly newspapers published in Ontario